Surques is a commune in the Pas-de-Calais department in the Hauts-de-France region of France.

Geography
Surques is located some 15 miles (24 km) west of Saint-Omer, on the D215 road, in the valley of the Hem river.

Population

Places of interest
 The church of Saints Crépin-et-Crépinien, dating from the sixteenth century.
 The remains of the medieval Manoir de Brugnobois.

See also
Communes of the Pas-de-Calais department

References

Communes of Pas-de-Calais